was a Japanese professional baseball first baseman in Nippon Professional Baseball. He played for the Toei Flyers / Nittaku Home Flyers / Nippon Ham Fighters from 1965 to 1974 and the Yakult Swallows from 1975 to 1983. He was the Japan Series MVP in 1978 and was inducted into the Japanese Baseball Hall of Fame in 1997. Osugi's 486 career home runs places him ninth on the all-time NPB list.

References

1945 births
1992 deaths
Baseball people from Okayama Prefecture
Japanese baseball players
Nippon Professional Baseball infielders
Toei Flyers players
Nippon Ham Fighters players
Yakult Swallows players
Japanese baseball coaches
Nippon Professional Baseball coaches
Japanese Baseball Hall of Fame inductees